Yu Dabao (born 18 April 1988) is a Chinese professional footballer who currently plays for Chinese Super League club Beijing Guoan.

Club career
Yu Dabao started his football career playing for second-tier side Qingdao Hailifeng and was soon called up to the Chinese under-17 national team. With the under-17 side, he played well during the 2004 AFC U-17 Championship and was quickly regarded as one of the best prospects in China due to his aerial and counterattacking abilities. This saw many clubs reportedly interested in the Yu including  Ajax, Newcastle United, and Rangers; however, he joined Benfica on a three-year deal. In his debut match, only five days and three training sessions after he arrived in Portugal, Yu scored three goals and assisted a fourth in a reserve match against Portimonense.

Due to Yu's strong performances for Benfica's reserves, he was given the chance of training with the first team during preseason and was thus officially added to the first team. He made his debut for the club on 26 September 2007 in a 0-0 draw against Estrela da Amadora in the Taça da Liga, winning 5-4 on penalties. He was then soon loaned out to second-tier side C.D. Aves and then third-tier side Olivais Moscavide but was unable to save them from relegation as they suffered defeat in the last match of the season. Speculation then grew that Yu was willing to leave Benfica after his loan period at C.D. Mafra ended. By 13 May 2009, Yu revealed in a telephone interview that he was about to leave to spend the offseason back in his homeland; however, he received a call from Benfica asking him to stay until further notice.

By February 2010, Yu's contract with Benfica had ended and he went on trial with Major League Soccer side FC Dallas; however, he was unable to receive a contract with them. He then signed a contract with top-tier side Tianjin Teda before the start of the 2010 season. His move turned out to be a big success and he went on to win the 2011 Chinese FA Cup, which saw him become one of the most sought-after players in China. On 27 February 2012, it was reported that Yu transferred to reigning league champions Guangzhou Evergrande for a reported fee of ¥15 million; however, Guangzhou withdrew from the transfer talk in the afternoon that day and he transferred to the newly promoted side Dalian Aerbin the next day.

On 27 December 2014, Yu transferred to fellow Chinese Super League side Beijing Guoan after Dalian was relegated at the end of the 2014 season. By the 2018 league season, coach Roger Schmidt would name Yu as the club's captain and convert him into a centre-back. This change in position would see Yu lead Beijing to go on to win the 2018 Chinese FA Cup.

International career
Yu was called up to the Chinese national team by then manager Gao Hongbo and made his debut on 18 December 2010 in a 3-0 win against Estonia. After making several further appearances, he scored his first goal for China on 22 February 2012 in a 2-0 unofficial friendly win against Kuwait. Yu did not have to wait long before he scored his first official goal when he scored on 29 February 2012 in a 3-1 win against Jordan during 2014 FIFA World Cup qualification.

Career statistics

Club statistics
.

International statistics

International goals
 
Scores and results list China's goal tally first.

Honours
Tianjin Teda
Chinese FA Cup: 2011.

Beijing Guoan
Chinese FA Cup: 2018.

China U-17
AFC U-17 Championship: 2004.

References

External links
 Player profile at Sina.com.cn 
 Player profile at Sohu.com 
 
 
 

1988 births
Living people
Chinese footballers
Footballers from Qingdao
China youth international footballers
China international footballers
S.L. Benfica footballers
C.D. Olivais e Moscavide players
C.D. Mafra players
C.D. Aves players
Chinese expatriate footballers
Chinese expatriate sportspeople in Portugal
Chinese Super League players
China League One players
Tianjin Jinmen Tiger F.C. players
Dalian Professional F.C. players
Beijing Guoan F.C. players
2019 AFC Asian Cup players
Association football midfielders
Association football forwards